Riverside Energy Center is an electrical power station located north of Beloit, Wisconsin in the Town of Beloit, just west of the Rock River. It consists of two 2-on-1 units (2 Combustion turbines per 1 HRSG). The facility is owned and operated by Alliant Energy.

History
Riverside is a 603 MW combined cycle natural gas facility built by Calpine. It began producing power June 2004.

Purchase of the plant by Wisconsin Power & Light was approved by the Public Service Commission of Wisconsin in April 2011.

In November 2014, Alliant announced it planned to expand Riverside Energy Center with an additional $725 million, 650 MW, combined cycle natural gas generating facility. Alliant said they planned to begin construction in 2016 and be producing power in 2019.

Adjacent facilities
There is an Alliant maintenance facility located adjacent to the center as well as the Rock River Generating Station, a natural gas-fired power plant.

See also
List of power stations in Wisconsin

References

External links
 Alliant Energy

Energy infrastructure completed in 2004
Buildings and structures in Rock County, Wisconsin
Natural gas-fired power stations in Wisconsin
Alliant Energy